Gonbadan may refer to:
 Gonbadan, East Azerbaijan
 Gonbadan, Hamadan
 Gonbadan, Kerman

See also
 Gonbad, Iran (disambiguation)
 Do Gonbadan